Patrice Ledoux is a French film producer.

Filmography
 The Big Blue (1988)
 Nikita (1990)
 Atlantis (1991)
 1, 2, 3, Sun (1993)
 Léon (1994)
 The Fifth Element (1997)
 The Messenger: The Story of Joan of Arc (1999)
 Just Visiting (2001)
 J'ai faim !!! (2001)
 Camping 2 (2010)
 The Sense of Wonder (2015)

References

External links

French film producers
Living people
Year of birth missing (living people)